The 1958 Railway Cup Hurling Championship was the 32nd series of the inter-provincial hurling Railway Cup. Three matches were played between 16 February 1958 and 17 March 1958 to decide the title. It was contested by Connacht, Leinster, Munster and Ulster.

Munster entered the championship as the defending champions.

On 17 March 1958, Munster won the Railway Cup after a 3–07 to 3–05 defeat of Leinster in the final at Croke Park, Dublin. It was their second Railway Cup title in succession.

Leinster's Christy O'Brien was the Railway Cup top scorer with 4-00.

Results

Semi-finals

Final

Top scorers

Overall

References

Sources

 Donegan, Des, The Complete Handbook of Gaelic Games (DBA Publications Limited, 2005).

External links
 Munster Railway Cup-winning teams

Hurling competitions in Ireland
Railway Cup Hurling Championship
Railway Cup Hurling Championship